The Château de Richemont is a château in Saint-Crépin-de-Richemont, Dordogne, Nouvelle-Aquitaine, France. It was built between 1564 and 1610.

Châteaux in Dordogne
Houses completed in 1610
1610 establishments in France